In 1264, the Duke of Krakow, Boleslaw V the Chaste organized an expedition against Yotvingia, who were allied with Shvarn, the Duke of the Kingdom of Galicia–Volhynia. The immediate cause of the expedition was the Yotvingian raid into Polish territories in 1264 during which they ravished and plundered the country.

On 23 June 1264 the two armies met near Brańsk. The Battle of Brańsk lasted two days pitting the forces of Yotvingia, led by Komata (Kumata) against the well prepared and organized Polish (Krakovian) army. The Yotvingian forces were routed in a bloody battle and Komata was killed.

Despite the defeat of the Yotvingian forces, skirmishes occurred for another 20 years.

References 
  Piotr Bunar, Stanisław A. Sroka, Słownik wojen, bitew i potyczek w średniowiecznej Polsce, wyd. Universitas 2004.

Conflicts in 1264
Bransk
1264 in Europe
13th century in Poland